

Before 1490

According to Canadian scholar Adam Jones, if a dominant group of people had little in common with a marginalized group of people, it was easy for the dominant group to define the other as subhuman. As a result, the marginalized group might be labeled as a threat that must be eliminated. Jones continues: "The difficulty, as Frank Chalk and Kurt Jonassohn pointed out in their early study, is that such historical records as exist are ambiguous and undependable. While history today is generally written with some fealty to 'objective' facts, most previous accounts aimed rather to praise the writer's patron (normally the leader) and to emphasize the superiority of one's own gods and religious beliefs."

Wrote Chalk and Jonassohn: "Historically and anthropologically peoples have always had a name for themselves. In a great many cases, that name meant 'the people' to set the owners of that name off against all other people who were considered of lesser quality in some way. If the differences between the people and some other society were particularly large in terms of religion, language, manners, customs, and so on, then such others were seen as less than fully human: pagans, savages, or even animals."

Ancient genocides 
Scholars of antiquity differentiate genocide from gendercide, in which groups of people were conquered and the males who belonged to the conquered groups were killed but the children (particularly girls) and women were incorporated into the conquering groups. Jones notes, "Chalk and Jonassohn provide a wide-ranging selection of historical events such as the Assyrian Empire's root-and branch depredations in the first half of the first millennium BCE, and the destruction of Melos by Athens during the Peloponnesian War (431–404 BCE), a gendercidal rampage described by Thucydides in his 'Melian Dialogue'.

Massacres which are recorded in religious scriptures like the Hebrew Bible have also been described as genocides, such as the destruction of the Midianites by the Israelites which is described in Numbers 31:7-18, an event which took place in the 2nd millennium BCE. Jones notes that this massacre is an example of the partial destruction and the partial incorporation of an enemy ethnicity.

Destruction of Carthage 

During the Third Punic War, the city of Carthage was besieged by Roman forces for three years (149–146 BCE). Once the city was breached, the Romans spent seven days systematically destroying it and killing its inhabitants. Ben Kiernan has labelled the devastation of the city and the massacre of its population "The First Genocide."

Asiatic Vespers 

In 88 BCE, King Mithridates VI of Pontus ordered the murder of all Italics in Asia Minor, resulting in the deaths of about 100,000, mainly civilians. The death toll makes it one of the deadliest recorded genocides in classical antiquity. This action provoked the Romans, leading to the First Mithridatic War.

Tencteri and Usipetes 
Julius Caesar's campaign against the Tencteri and Usipetes has been characterized as genocidal.

Gallic Wars 
During the Gallic Wars Caesar reported that he burnt every village and building that he could find in the territory of the Eburones, drove off all of the cattle, and his men and beasts consumed all of the corn that the weather of the autumnal season had not destroyed. He left those who had hid themselves, if there were any, alive in the hope that they would all die of hunger in the winter. Caesar said that he wanted to annihilate the Eburones as well as their name, and indeed, we hear nothing more about the Eburones. Their country was soon occupied by a Germanic tribe with a different name, the Tungri. However, the report by Tacitus which states that the Tungri were the original "Germani" who first crossed the Rhine, and the way this matches Caesar's description of the Eburones and their neighbours, leads to the possibility that they survived under a new name.

However, Heinrichs (2008) argues that the genocide of the Eburones in 53 BCE could not have happened as Caesar claimed. If the systematic destruction of infrastructure by the Roman forces was intended to prevent the local people from regaining power, the physical extermination of them proved to be impractical. The available areas of refuge which were hardly accessible to the Roman legions were numerous: the low mountain range of the Ardennes, the swamps and wastelands which were located towards the Menapii, the coastal islands, etc. Moreover, Caesar's second attempt to annihilate the tribe two years later is proof that the community survived, and its apparent ability to regenerate itself lead Caesar to believe that he needed to launch more raids against them. According to Roymans (2004), their disappearance from the political map may have resulted from "a policy of damnatio memoriae on the part of the Roman authorities, in combination with the confiscation of Eburonean territory". A great part of their gold fell into Roman hands during repeated Roman raids on the Eburones in 53–51 BCE, and then it was melted down and carried off.

Bar Kokhba revolt 

The Bar Kokhba revolt (Mered Bar Kokhba) was a rebellion of the Jews of the Roman province of Judea, led by Simon bar Kokhba, against the Roman Empire. Fought circa 132–136 CE, it was the last of three major Jewish–Roman wars. The revolt erupted as a result of religious and political tensions which existed in Judea since the end of the failed First Revolt in 66–73 CE. These tensions were exacerbated by the establishment of a large Roman military presence in Judea, changes in administrative life and the economy, together with the outbreak and suppression of Jewish revolts from Mesopotamia to Libya and Cyrenaica. The proximate reasons seem to be the construction of a new city, Aelia Capitolina, over the ruins of Jerusalem and the erection of a temple to Jupiter on the Temple Mount. The Church Fathers and rabbinic literature emphasize the role of Rufus, governor of Judea, in provoking the revolt. The Bar Kokhba revolt resulted in the extensive depopulation of Judean communities, more so than during the First Jewish–Roman War of 70 CE. According to Cassius Dio, 580,000 Jews perished in the war and many more died of hunger and disease. In addition, many Judean war captives were sold into slavery. The Jewish communities of Judea were devastated to an extent which some scholars describe as a genocide. However, the Jewish population remained strong in other parts of Palestine, thriving in Galilee, Golan, Bet Shean Valley and the eastern, southern and western edges of Judea. Roman casualties were also considered heavy—XXII Deiotariana was disbanded after serious losses. In addition, some historians argue that Legio IX Hispana's disbandment in the mid-2nd century could have been a result of this war. In an attempt to erase any memory of Judea or Ancient Israel, Emperor Hadrian wiped the name off the map and replaced it with Syria Palaestina.

Wu Hu and Jie 

Ancient Chinese texts state that General Ran Min ordered the extermination of the Wu Hu, especially the Jie people, during the Wei–Jie war in the fourth century CE. The Jie were an ethnic group which possessed racial characteristics which included high-bridged noses and bushy beards, and as a result, they were easily identified and killed. In total, 200,000 of them were reportedly massacred.

Zandaqa 
Zindīq (زنديق) or Zandik (𐭦𐭭𐭣𐭩𐭪) was initially used to negatively denote the followers of the Manichaeian religion in the Sasanian Empire. By the time of the 8th-century Abbasid Caliphate however, the meaning of the word zindīq and the adjectival zandaqa had broadened and could loosely denote many things: Gnostic Dualists as well as followers of Manichaeism, agnostics, and atheists. However, many of those who were persecuted for being zandaqa under the Abbasids claimed to be Muslims, and when it was applied to Muslims, the accusation was that the accused secretly harbored Manichaean beliefs. "The proof for such an accusation was sought, if at all, in an indication of some kind of dualism, or if that individual openly flouted Islamic beliefs or practices." As such, certain Muslim poets of early Abbasid times could also be accused of being zandaqa as much as an actual Manichaean might be.

The charge of being a zandaqa was a serious one, and it could cost the accused his/her life.  A history of the time states cites the "Spiller" caliph Abu al-'Abbas as having said "tolerance is laudable, except in matters which are dangerous to religious belief, or matters which are dangerous to the sovereign's dignity." The third Abbasid caliph, Al-Mahdi, ordered the composition of polemical works that were to be used to refute the beliefs of freethinkers and other heretics, and for years, he attempted to completely exterminate them, hunting them down and exterminating freethinkers in large numbers, putting anyone who was merely suspected of being a zindiq to death.  Al-Mahdi's successors, the caliphs al-Hadi and Harun al-Rashid, continued the pogroms, although they occurred with diminished intensity during the reign of the latter and were later ended by him. In turn this policy influenced the Mihna policy of al-Ma'mun which targeted those Muslim religious scholars and officials who refused to accept the doctrine of the created nature of the Quran.

Ancestral Puebloans 
A 2010 study suggests that a group of Ancestral Puebloans in the American Southwest were killed in a genocide that took place circa 800 CE.

Kashmiri Shias 

The history of Shi'ism in Kashmir is marked by conflicts and strife, spanning over half a millennium. Incidents of sectarian violence occurred in Kashmir under the rule of Mirza Haider Dughlat, followed by the Mughals (1586–1752), the Afghans (1752–1819), the Sikhs (1819–1845) and the Dogras (1846–1947). A small Shia community has managed to survive in Kashmir until today.

13th-century extermination of the Cathars 

The Albigensian Crusade or the Cathar Crusade (1209–1229) was a 20-year-long military campaign which Pope Innocent III initiated in order to eliminate Catharism in Languedoc, in Southern France. The Crusade was primarily prosecuted by the French crown and it promptly took on a political flavour, it not only resulted in a significant reduction in the number of practising Cathars, it also resulted in a realignment of the County of Toulouse in Languedoc, bringing it into the sphere of the French crown and diminishing the distinct regional culture and high level of influence of the Counts of Barcelona.

Raphael Lemkin, who coined the word "genocide" in the 20th century, referred to the Albigensian Crusade as "one of the most conclusive cases of genocide in religious history". Mark Gregory Pegg writes that "The Albigensian Crusade ushered genocide into the West by linking divine salvation to mass murder, by making slaughter as loving an act as His sacrifice on the cross." Robert E. Lerner argues that Pegg's classification of the Albigensian Crusade as a genocide is inappropriate, on the ground that it "was proclaimed against unbelievers ... not against a 'genus' or people; those who joined the crusade had no intention of annihilating the population of southern France ... If Pegg wishes to connect the Albigensian Crusade to modern ethnic slaughter, well—words fail me (as they do him)." Laurence Marvin is not as dismissive as Lerner regarding Pegg's contention that the Albigensian Crusade was a genocide; he does however take issue with Pegg's argument that the Albigensian Crusade formed an important historical precedent for later genocides including the Holocaust.

Kurt Jonassohn and Karin Solveig Björnson describe the Albigensian Crusade as "the first ideological genocide". Kurt Jonassohn and Frank Chalk (who together founded the Montreal Institute for Genocide and Human Rights Studies) include a detailed case study of the Albigensian Crusade in their genocide studies textbook The History and Sociology of Genocide: Analyses and Case Studies, authored by Strayer and Malise Ruthven.

Mongol Empire 
Quoting Eric Margolis, Jones observes that in the 13th century the Mongol armies under Genghis Khan were genocidal killers who were known to eradicate whole nations. He ordered the extermination of the Tata Mongols, and all Kankalis males in Bukhara "taller than a wheel" using a technique called measuring against the linchpin. In the end, half of the Mongol tribes were exterminated by Genghis Khan. Rosanne Klass referred to the Mongols' rule of Afghanistan as "genocide". It has been estimated that approximately 11% of the world's population was killed either during or immediately after the Turco-Mongol invasions (around 37.75 - 60 million people genocide in Eurasia, out of which at least 35 million deaths were in China). If the calculations are accurate, the events would be the deadliest acts of mass killings in human history.

The second campaign against Western Xia, the final military action led by Genghis Khan, and during which he died, involved an intentional and systematic destruction of Western Xia cities and culture. According to John Man, because of this policy of total obliteration, Western Xia is little known to anyone other than experts in the field because so little record is left of that society. He states that "There is a case to be made that this was the first ever recorded example of attempted genocide. It was certainly very successful ethnocide."

Tamerlane 
Similarly, the Turko-Mongol conqueror Tamerlane was known for his extreme brutality and his conquests were accompanied by genocidal massacres. William Rubinstein wrote: "In Assyria (1393–4)—Tamerlane got around—he killed all the Christians he could find, including everyone in the, then, Christian city of Tikrit, thus virtually destroying Assyrian Church of the East. Impartially, however, Tamerlane also slaughtered Shi'ite Muslims, Jews and heathens."

Guanches 

The conquest of the Canary Islands by the Crown of Castille took place between 1402 and 1496. Initially carried out by members of the Castilian nobility in exchange for a covenant of allegiance to the crown, the process was later carried out by the Spanish crown itself during the reign of the Catholic Monarchs. Some historians have labeled the conquest genocidal in nature due to the brutal treatment of the Islands' indigenous Guanches which contributed to their extinction as a distinct group.

1490 to 1914

Africa

Atlantic Slave Trade 
Canadian scholar Adam Jones characterized the mass death of millions of Africans during the Atlantic slave trade as a genocide due to the fact that it was "one of the worst holocausts in human history" because it resulted in 15 to 20 million deaths according to one estimate, and he contradicts arguments such as the one which states that "it was in slave owners’ interest to keep slaves alive, not exterminate them" by stating that they are "mostly sophistry" by stating: "the killing and destruction were intentional, whatever the incentives to preserve survivors of the Atlantic passage for labor exploitation. To revisit the issue of intent already touched on: If an institution is deliberately maintained and expanded by discernible agents, though all are aware of the hecatombs of casualties it is inflicting on a definable human group, then why should this not qualify as genocide?"

Congo 

From 1885 to 1908, the Congo Free State in central Africa was privately controlled by Leopold II of Belgium, who extracted a fortune from the land by the use of forced labour of natives. Under his regime, there were 2 to 15 million deaths among the Congolese people. Deliberate killings, abusive punishments, and general exploitation were major causes of the deaths. As in the colonization of the Americas, European diseases, hitherto unknown in the region, also led to a considerable number of deaths. Because the main motive for the killings was financial gain, it has been debated whether the term genocide describes these atrocities well. However, Robert Weisbord wrote in the Journal of Genocide Research in 2003 that attempting to eliminate a portion of the population is enough to qualify as genocide under the UN convention. Reports of the atrocities led to a major international scandal in the early 20th century, and Leopold was ultimately forced in 1908 by the Belgian government to relinquish control of the colony to the civil administration.

Ethiopia under Menelik II (1889–1913) 
During its military conquests, its centralization of its power and its incorporation of territories into Ethiopia as decreed by Menelik II, his army committed genocidal atrocities against civilians and combatants which included torture, mass killings and the imposition of large scale slavery. Large scale atrocities were also committed against the Dizi people and the people of the Kaficho kingdom. Some estimates of the number of people who were killed in the atrocities that were committed during the war and the famine which coincided with it go into the millions. According to Alexander Bulatovich, Menelik's Russian military aide, Menelik's armies "dreadfully annihilated more than half" of the Oromo (Galla) population down to 5 million people, which "took away from the Galla all possibility of thinking about any sort of uprising." Eshete Gemeda put the death toll even higher at 6 million.

These deaths may have also been caused by the great famine, which lasted from 1888 to 1892 and was the worst famine in the region's history; a third of Ethiopia's total population of 12 million was killed according to some estimates. The famine was caused by rinderpest, an infectious viral cattle disease which wiped out most of the national livestock, killing over 90% of the cattle. The population of native cattle had no prior exposure to the disease and as a result, it was unable to fight it off. Despite the violence of the conquest, some historians stress the fact that before the centralization process was completed, Ethiopia was devastated by numerous wars which started in the 16th century. In the intervening period, military tactics had not changed much. In the 16th century, the Portuguese Bermudes documented depopulation and widespread atrocities against civilians and combatants (atrocities which included torture, mass killings and the imposition of large scale slavery) during several successive Aba Gedas' Gadaa conquests of territories which were located north of the Genale river (Bali, Amhara, Gafat, Damot, Adal). Warfare in the region essentially involved acquiring cattle and slaves, winning additional territories, gaining control of trade routes and carrying out ritual requirements or securing trophies to prove masculinity. Wars were fought between people who might be members of the same linguistic group, religion and culture, or between unrelated tribes. Centralization greatly reduced these continuous wars; minimizing the loss of lives, raids, destruction and slavery that had previously been the norm.

French conquest of Algeria 

Ben Kiernan wrote in his book Blood and Soil: A World History of Genocide and Extermination from Sparta to Darfur on the French conquest of Algeria, that within three decades of the French conquest of Algeria in 1830, war, famine and disease had reduced the original population from 3 million by a figure ranging from 500,000 to 1,000,000.

By 1875, the French conquest was complete. The war had killed approximately 825,000 indigenous Algerians since 1830. A long shadow of genocidal hatred persisted, provoking the French author to protest in 1882 that in Algeria, "we hear it repeated every day that we must expel the native and if necessary destroy him." As a French statistical journal urged five years later, "the system of extermination must give way to a policy of penetration."

In response to France's recognition of Armenian genocide, Turkey accused France of committing genocide against 15% of Algeria's population.

German South West Africa 

The Herero and Namaqua peoples of present-day Namibia endured a genocidal persecution between 1904 and 1907 while their homeland was under colonial rule as German South West Africa. Large percentages of their populations perished in a brutal scorched earth campaign led by German General Lothar von Trotha. An estimated 10,000 Namaqua were killed, with estimates for the Herero ranging from 60,000 and 100,000.

A copy of Trotha's Extermination Order survives in the Botswana National Archives. The order states "every Herero, with or without a gun, with or without cattle, will be shot. I will no longer accept women or children, I will drive them back to their people [to die in the desert] or let them be shot at." Olusoga and Erichsen write: "It is an almost unique document: an explicit, written declaration of intent to commit genocide."

Zulu Kingdom under Shaka Zulu 

Between 1810 and 1828, the Zulu kingdom under Shaka Zulu laid waste to large parts of present-day South Africa and Zimbabwe. Frequently, Zulu armies not only aimed to defeat their enemies, they aimed to totally destroy them. Those who were exterminated included prisoners of war, women, children and even dogs. Estimates of the death toll range from 1 million to 2 million.

Americas 

According to historian David Stannard, over the course of more than four centuries "from the 1490s into the 1890s, Europeans and white Americans engaged in an unbroken string of genocide campaigns against the native peoples of the Americas." Stannard writes that the native population had been reduced savagely by invasions of European plague and violence and that by around 1900 only one-third of one percent of America's population—250,000 out of 76,000,000 people–were natives. He calls it "the worst human holocaust the world had ever witnessed", and it leveled off because "there was, at last, almost no one left to kill." 
On 20 January 1513, Vasco Núñez de Balboa wrote to the king advocating genocide against the native population in the Caribbean. Balboa slew hundreds in Caribbean villages. The crown later withdrew support and Balboa was executed in 1519.

Raphael Lemkin (coiner of the term genocide) considered colonial abuses of the Native population of the Americas to constitute cultural and even outright genocide including the abuses of the Encomienda system. He described slavery as "cultural genocide par excellence" noting "it is the most effective and thorough method of destroying culture, of desocializing human beings." He considers colonists guilty due to failing to halt the abuses of the system despite royal orders. He also notes the sexual abuse of Spanish colonizers of Native women as acts of "biological genocide". In this vein, Stannard described the encomienda as a genocidal system which "had driven many millions of native peoples in Central and South America to early and agonizing deaths." Anthropologist Jason Hickel asserts that during Spanish rule of Hispaniola, many Arawaks died from lethal forced labor in the mines, in which a third of workers died every six months and that within two years of the arrival of Christopher Columbus half the population of Hispaniola had been killed. According to anthropologist Russell Thornton, for the American Indians "the arrival of the Europeans marked the beginning of a long holocaust, although it came not in ovens, as it did for the Jews. The fires that consumed North America Indians were the fevers brought on by newly encountered diseases, the flashes of settlers' and soldiers' guns, the ravages of 'firewater,' the flames of villages and fields burned by the scorched-earth policy of vengeful Euro-Americans." 
Some authors, including Holocaust scholar David Cesarani, have argued that United States government policies in furtherance of its so-called Manifest Destiny constituted genocide.

Some historians disagree that genocide, defined as a crime of intent, should be used to describe the colonization experience. Stafford Poole, a research historian, wrote: "There are other terms to describe what happened in the Western Hemisphere, but genocide is not one of them. It is a good propaganda term in an age where slogans and shouting have replaced reflection and learning, but to use it in this context is to cheapen both the word itself and the appalling experiences of the Jews and Armenians, to mention but two of the major victims of this century." Noble David Cook, writing about the Black Legend and the conquest of the Americas wrote, "There were too few Spaniards to have killed the millions who were reported to have died in the first century after Old and New World contact". He instead estimates that the death toll was caused by diseases like smallpox, which according to some estimates had an 80–90% fatality rate in Native American populations. Political scientist Guenter Lewy says "even if up to 90 percent of the reduction in Indian population was the result of disease, that leaves a sizable death toll caused by mistreatment and violence"; however, he rejected calling it genocide stating that 

Historian Roxanne Dunbar-Ortiz opposes these viewpoints and says, "Proponents of the default position emphasize attrition by disease despite other causes equally deadly, if not more so. In doing so they refuse to accept that the colonization of America was genocidal by plan, not simply the tragic fate of populations lacking immunity to disease. In the case of the Jewish Holocaust, no one denies that more Jews died of starvation, overwork, and disease under Nazi incarceration than died in gas ovens, yet the acts of creating and maintaining the conditions that led to those deaths clearly constitute genocide."

Historian Andrés Reséndez argues that even though the Spanish were aware of the spread of smallpox, they made no mention of it until 1519, a quarter century after Columbus arrived in Hispaniola. Instead he contends that enslavement in gold and silver mines was the primary reason why the Native American population of Hispaniola dropped so significantly. and that even though disease was a factor, the native population would have rebounded the same way Europeans did following the Black Death if it were not for the constant enslavement they were subject to. He contends that enslavement of Native Americans was one of the causes of their depopulation in North America; that the majority of Indians enslaved were women and children compared to the enslavement of Africans which mostly targeted adult males and in turn they were sold at a 50% to 60% higher price, and that 2,462,000 to 4,985,000 Amerindians were enslaved between Columbus's arrival and 1900 throughout the Americas.

Several films and books on the subject were released around the year 1992 to coincide with the 500th anniversary of Columbus' voyage. In 2003, Venezuelan President Hugo Chávez urged Latin Americans not to celebrate the Columbus Day holiday. Chavez blamed Columbus for spearheading "the biggest invasion and genocide ever seen in the history of humanity."

According to scientists from University College London, the colonization of the Americas caused so much disease and death in the 100 years after 1492, that it contributed to climate change and global cooling. The depopulation caused the abandonment and reforestation of large areas of farmland, resulting in large enough decreases in carbon dioxide to cool the earth.

Argentina 

The Conquest of the Desert was a military campaign mainly directed by General Julio Argentino Roca in the 1870s, which established Argentine dominance over Patagonia, then inhabited by indigenous peoples, killing more than 1,300.

Contemporary sources indicate that it was a deliberate genocide by the Argentine government. Others perceived the campaign as intending to suppress only groups of aboriginals that refused to submit to the government and carried out attacks on European settlements.

Canada

Ontario
Between 1640 and 1649, among the Indigenous peoples in Canada, the Iroquois Indians committed a "genocidal annihilation" of the Huron Indians. Settlements were burned, and of the 30,000 Hurons, a few thousand were able to flee and avoid the ethnic genocide.

Newfoundland 

The Beothuks attempted to avoid contact with Europeans in Newfoundland by moving from their traditional settlements. The Beothuks were put into a position where they were forced from their traditional land and lifestyle into ecosystems that could not support them and that led to undernourishment and eventually starvation. While some scholars believe that the Beothuk primarily died out due to the elements noted above, another hypothesis is that Europeans conducted a sustained campaign of genocide against them. They were officially declared "extinct" after the death of Shanawdithit in 1829 in the capital, St. John's, where she had been taken.

Haiti 
Jean-Jacques Dessalines, the first ruler of an independent Haiti, ordered the killing of the white population of French creoles on Haiti, which culminated in the 1804 Haiti massacre. According to Philippe Girard, "when the genocide was over, Haiti's white population was virtually non-existent."

Mexico

Yucatán 

The Caste War of Yucatán (approx. 1847–1901) against the population of European descent, known locally as Yucatecos, who held political and economic control of the region. Adam Jones wrote:
"Genocidal atrocities on both sides cost up to 200,000 killed."

Apaches 
In 1835, Don Ignacio Zuniga, commander of the presidios of northern Sonora, asserted that since 1820, the Apaches had killed at least 5,000 Mexican settlers in retaliation for land encroachments in Apachería. The State of Sonora then offered a bounty on Apache scalps in 1835. Beginning in 1837, the State of Chihuahua also offered a bounty of 100 pesos per warrior, 50 pesos per woman and 25 pesos per child.

Yaquis 

The Mexican government's response to the various uprisings of the Yaqui tribe have been likened to genocide particularly under Porfirio Diaz. By the end of Diaz's rule at least 20,000 Yaquis were killed in Sonora and their population was reduced from 30,000 to 7,000. Mexican president Andrés Manuel López Obrador said he'd be willing to offer apologies for the abuses in 2019.

Peru 
"The indigenous rebellions of Túpac Amaru II and Túpac Katari against the Spanish between 1780 and 1782, cost over 100,000 mestizos, native peruvians and Spanish settlers' lives in Peru and Upper Peru (present-day Bolivia)."

United States 

According to Native American Studies professor Roxanne Dunbar-Ortiz, US history, as well as inherited Indigenous trauma, cannot be understood without dealing with the genocide that the United States committed against Indigenous peoples. Ortiz 
states that from the colonial period through the founding of the United States and continuing in the twentieth century, this has entailed torture, terror, sexual abuse, massacres, systematic military occupations, removals of Indigenous peoples from their ancestral territories, forced removal of Native American children to military-like boarding schools, allotment, and a policy of termination.

The leader of this battle, British High Commander Jeffery Amherst authorized the intentional use of disease as a biological weapon, notably during the 1763 Siege of Fort Pitt against indigenous populations, saying, "You will Do well to try to Innoculate the Indians by means of Blanketts, as well as to try Every other method that can serve to Extirpate this Execrable Race", and instructing his subordinates, "I need only Add, I Wish to Hear of no prisoners should any of the villains be met with arms." British militia's William Trent and Simeon Ecuyer gave smallpox-exposed blankets to Native American emissaries as gifts during the Siege of Fort Pitt, "to Convey the Smallpox to the Indians", in one of the most famously documented cases of germ warfare. While it is uncertain how successful such attempts were against the target population, historians have noted that, "history records numerous instances of the French, the Spanish, the British, and later on the American, using smallpox as an ignoble means to an end. For smallpox was more feared by the Indian than the bullet: he could be exterminated and subjugated more easily and quickly by the death-bringing virus than by the weapons of the white man."

During the American Indian Wars, the United States Army carried out a number of massacres and forced relocations of Indigenous peoples, acts that some scholars say constitute genocide. The Sand Creek Massacre, which caused outrage in its own time, has been called genocide. General John Chivington led a 700-man force of Colorado Territory militia in a massacre of 70–163 peaceful Cheyenne and Arapaho, about two-thirds of whom were women, children, and infants. Chivington and his men took scalps and other body parts as trophies, including human fetuses and male and female genitalia. In defense of his actions Chivington stated,

A study by Gregory Michno concluded that of 21,586 tabulated casualties (killed, wounded or captured) in a selected 672 battles and skirmishes, military personnel and settlers accounted for 6,596 (31%), while indigenous casualties totaled about 14,990 (69%) for the period 1850–90. Michno's study almost exclusively uses Army estimates. His follow-up book "Forgotten Battles and Skirmishes" covers over 300 additional fights not included in these statistics.

According to the U.S. Bureau of the Census (1894), between 1789 and 1891, "The Indian wars under the government of the United States have been more than 40 in number. They have cost the lives of about 19,000 white men, women and children, including those killed in individual combats, and the lives of about 30,000 Indians. The actual number of killed and wounded Indians must be very much higher than the given... Fifty percent additional would be a safe estimate..." In the same 1894 report, the Census Bureau dismissed assertions that millions of Native Americans once inhabited what is now the United States, insisting instead that North America in 1492 was an almost empty continent, and "guesstimating" that aboriginal populations "could not have exceeded much over 500,000", whereas modern scholarship now estimates from 2.1 million to more than 10 million.

Chalk and Jonassohn argued that the deportation of the Cherokee tribe along the Trail of Tears would almost certainly be considered an act of genocide today. The Indian Removal Act of 1830 led to the exodus. About 17,000 Cherokees—along with approximately 2,000 Cherokee-owned black slaves—were removed from their homes. The number of people who died as a result of the Trail of Tears has been variously estimated. American doctor and missionary Elizur Butler, who made the journey with one party, estimated 4,000 deaths. Historians David Stannard and Barbara Mann have noted that the army deliberately routed the march of the Cherokee to pass through areas of known cholera epidemic, such as Vicksburg. Stannard estimates that during the forced removal from their homelands, following the Indian Removal Act signed into law by President Andrew Jackson in 1830, 8,000 Cherokee died, about half the total population.

A smallpox epidemic struck the Great Plains in 1836–1840, resulting in the deaths of many, including 90% of the Mandan who previously numbered 1,600. While specific responsibility for the epidemic remains in question, scholars have asserted that the Great Plains epidemic was "started among the tribes of the upper Missouri River by failure to quarantine steam boats on the river", and Captain Pratt of the St. Peter "was guilty of contributing to the deaths of thousands of innocent people. The law calls his offense criminal negligence. Yet in light of all the deaths, the almost complete annihilation of the Mandans, and the terrible suffering the region endured, the label criminal negligence is benign, hardly befitting an action that had such horrendous consequences." Archaeologist and anthropologist Ann F. Ramenofsky writes, "Variola Major can be transmitted through contaminated articles such as clothing or blankets. In the nineteenth century, the U. S. Army sent contaminated blankets to Native Americans, especially Plains groups, to control the Indian problem." According to Alexander Hinton, "the genocide of many Native American tribes" including the Mandans, was caused by "governmental assimilationist policies that coexisted with officially or unofficially sanctioned campaigns of war to eradicate, diminish, or forcibly evict the 'savages. When smallpox swept the northern plains of the US in 1837, Secretary of War Lewis Cass ordered that the Mandan (along with the Arikara, the Cree, and the Blackfeet) not be given smallpox vaccinations, which had been provided to other tribes in other areas. Some have posited that some tribes weren't given vaccines because they were hostile or because their land wasn't important for trading.

The U.S. colonization of California started in earnest in 1849, and it resulted in a large number of state-subsidized massacres of Native Americans by colonists in the territory, causing several ethnic groups to be entirely wiped out. In one such series of conflicts, the so-called Mendocino War and the subsequent Round Valley War, the entirety of the Yuki people were brought to the brink of extinction, from a previous population of some 3,500 people to fewer than 100. According to Russell Thornton, estimates of the pre-Columbian Indigenous population of California were at least 310,000, and perhaps as high as 705,000, but by 1849, due to Spanish and Mexican colonization and epidemics this number had decreased to 100,000, and from 1849 to 1890, the indigenous population of California had fallen below 20,000, primarily because of the killings. In An American Genocide, The United States and the California Catastrophe, 1846–1873, Historian Benjamin Madley recorded the number of killings of California Indians that occurred between 1846 and 1873. He found evidence that during this period, at least 9,400 to 16,000 California Indians were killed by non-Indians. Most of these killings occurred in more than 370 massacres (defined as the "intentional killing of five or more disarmed combatants or largely unarmed noncombatants, including women, children, and prisoners, whether in the context of a battle or otherwise"). 10,000 Indians were also kidnapped and sold as slaves. In a speech before representatives of Native American peoples in June, 2019, California governor Gavin Newsom apologized for the genocide. Newsom said, "That’s what it was, a genocide. No other way to describe it. And that’s the way it needs to be described in the history books."

Indeed, noted children's book author of "The Wizard of Oz", L. Frank Baum, contemporaneously and freely admitted to the definition of genocide—annihilation of a people—as being deliberately intended, in the aftermath of the Wounded Knee Massacre and slaughter of the Lakota and their leader Sitting Bull:

"The Whites, by law of conquest, by justice of civilization, are masters of the American continent, and the best safety of the frontier settlements will be secured by the total annihilation of the few remaining Indians. Why not annihilation? Their glory has fled, their spirit broken, their manhood effaced; better that they die than live the miserable wretches that they are."

Asia

Afghanistan 

Abdur Rahman's subjugation of the Hazara ethnic group in the late nineteenth century due to its fierce rebellion against the Afghan king gave birth to an intense feeling of hatred between the Pashtun and the Hazara that would last for years to come. Massive forced displacements, especially in Oruzgan and Daychopan, continued as lands were confiscated and populations were expelled or fled. Some 35,000 families fled to northern Afghanistan, Mashhad (Iran) and Quetta (Pakistan). It is estimated that more than 60% of the Hazara were either massacred or displaced during Abdur Rahman's campaign against them. Hazara farmers were often forced to give up their property to Pashtuns and as a result many Hazara families had to move seasonally to the major cities in Afghanistan, Iran, or Pakistan in order to find jobs and sources of income. Quetta in Pakistan is home to the third largest settlements of Hazara outside Afghanistan.

British rule of India and elsewhere 
Mike Davis argues in his book Late Victorian Holocausts that quote; "Millions died, not outside the 'modern world system', but in the very process of being forcibly incorporated into its economic and political structures. They died in the golden age of Liberal Capitalism; indeed many were murdered...by the theological application of the sacred principles of Smith, Bentham, and Mill."

Davis characterizes the Indian famines under the British Raj, such as the Great Bengal famine of 1770 or the Great Famine of 1876-78 which took over 15 million lives as "colonial genocide." Some scholars, including Niall Ferguson, have disputed this judgement, while others, including Adam Jones, have affirmed it.  As many as 60 million people may have died of famine and its complications from 1765 to 1946.

Dutch East Indies 
The violence in the city lasted from 9 October until 22 October 1740, with minor skirmishes continuing outside the city walls into late November. Historians have estimated that at least 10,000 ethnic Chinese were massacred; just 600 to 3,000 are believed to have survived.

Dzungar genocide 

The Dzungar (or known as Zunghar), Oirat Mongols who lived in an area that stretched from the west end of the Great Wall of China to present-day eastern Kazakhstan and from present-day northern Kyrgyzstan to southern Siberia (most of which is located in present-day Xinjiang), were the last nomadic empire to threaten China, which they did from the early 17th century through the middle of the 18th century. After a series of inconclusive military conflicts that started in the 1680s, the Dzungars were subjugated by the Manchu-led Qing dynasty (1644–1911) in the late 1750s. According to Qing scholar Wei Yuan, 40 percent of the 600,000 Zunghar people were killed by smallpox, 20 percent fled to Russia or sought refuge among the Kazakh tribes and 30 percent were killed by the Qing army of Manchu Bannermen and Khalkha Mongols.

Historian Michael Edmund Clarke has argued that the Qing campaign in 1757–58 "amounted to the complete destruction of not only the Zunghar state but of the Zunghars as a people". Historian Peter Perdue has attributed the decimation of the Dzungars to a "deliberate use of massacre" and has described it as an "ethnic genocide". Mark Levene, a historian of genocide, has stated that the extermination of the Dzungars was "arguably the eighteenth century genocide par excellence".

Taiping Rebellion 

The Taiping Rebellion was a massive rebellion which was launched by Hong Xiuquan, an ethnic Hakka (a Han subgroup) and the self-proclaimed younger brother of Jesus, who sought to overthrow the Manchu-led Qing dynasty and replace it with a Chinese Christian theocratic absolute monarchy which he named the Taiping Heavenly Kingdom. One of the bloodiest wars in history and the bloodiest civil war in history, the Taiping Rebellion was marked by genocidal atrocities which were perpetrated by both of the sides which fought in the conflict.

In every area which they captured, the Taiping immediately exterminated the entire Manchu population. In the province of Hunan one Qing loyalist who observed the genocidal massacres which the Taiping forces committed against the Manchus wrote that the "pitiful Manchus", the Manchu men, women and children were executed by the Taiping forces. The Taiping rebels were seen chanting while slaughtering the Manchus in Hefei. After capturing Nanjing, Taiping forces killed about 40,000 Manchu civilians. On 27 October 1853 they crossed the Yellow River in T'sang-chou and murdered 10,000 Manchus.

Since the rebellion began in Guangxi, Qing forces allowed no rebels speaking its dialect to surrender. Reportedly in the province of Guangdong, it is written that 1,000,000 were executed because after the collapse of the Taiping Heavenly Kingdom, the Qing dynasty launched waves of massacres against the Hakkas, that at their height killed up to 30,000 each day. These policies of mass murder of civilians occurred elsewhere in China, including Anhui, and Nanjing. This resulted in a massive civilian flight and death toll with some 600 towns destroyed and other bloody policies resulting.

Japanese colonization of Hokkaido 

The Ainu are an indigenous people in Japan (Hokkaidō). In a 2009 news story, Japan Today reported, "Many Ainu were forced to work, essentially as slaves, for Wajin (ethnic Japanese), resulting in the breakup of families and the introduction of smallpox, measles, cholera and tuberculosis into their communities. In 1869, after the Battle of Hakodate during the Boshin War, the new Meiji government renamed the Republic of Ezo Hokkaido, whose boundaries were formed by former members of the Tokugawa shogunate, and together with lands where the Ainu lived, they were unilaterally incorporated into Japan. It banned the Ainu language, took Ainu lands away, and prohibited the Ainu from engaging in salmon fishing and deer hunting." Roy Thomas wrote: "Ill treatment of native peoples is common to all colonial powers, and, at its worst, leads to genocide. Japan's native people, the Ainu, have, however, been the object of a particularly cruel hoax, because the Japanese have refused to accept them officially as a separate minority people." In 2004, the small Ainu community which lives in Russia wrote a letter to Vladimir Putin, urging him to recognize Japanese mistreatment of the Ainu people as a genocide, something which Putin declined to do.

Armenians, Assyrians, Bulgarians, Greeks 

The Massacres of Badr Khan were conducted by Kurdish and Ottoman forces against the Assyrian Christian population of the Ottoman Empire between 1843 and 1847, resulting in the slaughter of more than 10,000 indigenous Assyrian civilians of the Hakkari region, with many thousands more being sold into slavery.

During the suppression of the April Uprising in Bulgaria in May–June 1876, 30,000 Bulgarians died and 5,000 Bulgarians were killed in Batak - according to modern researchers, the Batak massacre was the starting point of genocide in the modern era.

Between 1894 and 1896, a series of ethnically-religiously motivated Anti-Christian pogroms which are known as the Hamidian massacres were conducted against the ancient Armenian and Assyrian Christian populations by the forces of the Ottoman Empire. The massacres mainly took place in what is modern-day south eastern Turkey, north eastern Syria and northern Iraq. The death toll is estimated to have been as high as 325,000 people, with a further 546,000 Armenians and Assyrians made destitute by the forcible deportation of survivors from cities, and the destruction or the theft of almost 2500 of their farmsteads, towns and villages. Hundreds of churches and monasteries were either destroyed or forcibly converted into mosques.

The Adana massacre occurred in the Adana Vilayet of the Ottoman Empire in April 1909. A massacre of Armenian and Assyrian Christians in the city of Adana and its surroundings amidst the Ottoman countercoup of 1909 triggered a series of anti-Christian pogroms throughout the province. Reports estimated that the Adana Province massacres resulted in the death of as many as 30,000 Armenians and the death of as many as 1,500 Assyrians.

From 1913 to 1923, the Greek, Assyrian, and Armenian genocides took place in the Ottoman Empire. Some historians consider these genocides to be a single event and they refer to them as the late Ottoman genocides.

Philippines

Spanish colonial era 

Belinda A. Aquino describes Spanish colonial rule of the Philippines as one of the "most cruel colonial regimes in world history", characterized by the systematic destruction of native communities and their institutions, while the natives were forced to work on the colonial government's projects. She writes that the Spaniards imposed an alien religion, Catholicism, on the population while the native people's sacred indigenous religions and shrines were destroyed. She describes the Spanish conquest as genocide, with killings of natives being common. Furthermore, she writes that the Spanish continued to view the natives of the Philippines as "savages" and "pagans who had to be civilized" despite perpetrating atrocities.

According to Linda A. Newson's research, demographic decline occurred in the Philippines during the sixteenth and seventeenth centuries, primarily as a result of destructive epidemics which were introduced on the islands during the establishment of the Spanish colonial regime. It was previously assumed that the natives of the Philippines were immune to the diseases which decimated the populations of the New World, but Newson, using the data collected from historical demographic documents, argues that intermittent contact and low population density prevented the spread of such diseases before the arrival of the Spaniards, thus making them lethal to vulnerable populations. Yet despite the previous lack of exposure, diseases which were introduced to the Philippines were not seen as having an impact which was as great as the impact which they had on the New World. Newson also argues that the same factors which kept the diseases at bay before the Spanish conquest also helped curtail the spread of the infections during the early years of the Spanish colonial period. Newson also concludes that, for the indigenous population of the Philippines, "the demographic decline which occurred during the seventeenth century was the outcome of a complex interaction of factors which included the Hispano-Dutch War, the restructuring of Filipino communities, and periodic famines, epidemics and Moro raids".

American and Japanese eras 

There were numerous massacres in the Philippines during the American and Japanese occupations, notably massacres on Samar and Sulu, by Americans during Philippine-American war, and the Manila massacre by Japanese forces during World War 2.

Russian Empire

Congress Poland

Siberia

Circassians 

The Russian Tsarist Empire waged war against Circassia in the Northwest Caucasus for more than one hundred years, trying to secure its hold on the Circassia's Black Sea coast. After a century of insurgency and war and failure to end the conflict, the Russian military executed the systematic mass murder, ethnic cleansing, forced migration, and expulsion of 800,000–1,500,000 Circassians. The Georgian government has officially recognized the events as a genocide, 
as have Circassian advocacy organizations, 
a stance also held by a plethora of scholars of genocide and other historians, 
with Oliver Bullough crediting the Russian Empire with "the first modern genocide on European soil", 
and Anssi Kullberg arguing that the Russian state thus invented "the strategy of modern ethnic cleansing and genocide".
Antero Leitzinger flagged the affair the 19th century's largest genocide.

Calculations including those taking into account the Russian government's own archival figures have estimated a loss of 80%–97% of the Circassian nation in the process.

In May 1994, the then Russian President Boris Yeltsin admitted that resistance to the tsarist forces was legitimate, but he did not recognize "the guilt of the tsarist government for the genocide". On 5 July 2005, the Circassian Congress, an organisation that unites representatives of the various Circassian peoples in the Russian Federation, called on Moscow to acknowledge and apologize for the genocide. There is concern by the Russian government that acknowledging the events as genocide would entail possible claims of financial compensation in addition to efforts toward repatriating diaspora Circassians back to Circassia. A presidential commission in Russia has been set up "to counter the attempts to falsify history to the detriment of Russia".

Europe

Anti-Romani sentiment (Attempted extirpations of Romani/Gypsies) 

There have been several attempts to extirpate the Romani (Gypsies) throughout the history of Europe:

In 1545, the Diet of Augsburg declared that "whosoever kills a Gypsy (Romani), will be guilty of no murder". The subsequent massive killing spree which took place across the empire later prompted the government to step in to "forbid the drowning of Romani women and children".

In England, the Egyptians Act 1530 banned Romani from entering the country and it also required those Romani who were already living in the country to leave it within 16 days. Failure to do so could result in the confiscation of their property, their imprisonment and deportation. The act was amended with the Egyptians Act 1554, which directed that they abandon their "naughty, idle and ungodly life and company" and adopt a settled lifestyle. For those Romani who failed to adhere to a sedentary existence, the Privy council interpreted the act in a way that permitted the execution of non-complying Romani "as a warning to others".

In 1710, Joseph I, Holy Roman Emperor, issued an edict against the Romani, ordering "that all adult males were to be hanged without trial, whereas women and young males were to be flogged and banished forever." Additionally, in the kingdom of Bohemia, the right ears of Romani men were to be cut off; in the March of Moravia, their left ears were to be cut off. In other parts of Austria, they would be branded on the back with a branding iron, representing the gallows. These mutilations enabled the authorities to identify the individuals as Romani on their second arrest. The edict encouraged local officials to hunt down Romani in their areas by levying a fine of 100 Reichsthaler on those who failed to do so. Anyone who helped Romani was to be punished by doing forced labor for half a year. The result was mass killings of Romani across the Holy Roman empire. In 1721, Charles VI amended the decree to include the execution of adult female Romani, while children were "to be put in hospitals for education".

In 1774, Maria Theresa of Austria issued an edict which forbade marriages between Romani. When a Romani woman married a non-Romani man, she had to produce proof of "industrious household service and familiarity with Catholic tenets", a male Rom "had to prove his ability to support a wife and children", and "Gypsy children over the age of five were to be taken away and brought up in non-Romani families."

France

Persecution of Huguenots 

The St. Bartholomew's Day massacre in 1572 was a targeted group of assassinations and a wave of Catholic mob violence, directed against the Huguenots (French Calvinist Protestants) during the French Wars of Religion. Traditionally believed to have been instigated by Queen Catherine de' Medici, the mother of King Charles IX, the massacre started a few days after the marriage on 18 August of the king's sister  Margaret to the Protestant Henry of Navarre (the future Henry IV of France). Many of the wealthiest and most prominent Huguenots had gathered in largely Catholic Paris to attend the wedding.

The massacre began in the night of 23–24 August 1572, the eve of the feast of Bartholomew the Apostle, two days after the attempted assassination of Admiral  Gaspard de Coligny, the military and political leader of the Huguenots. King Charles IX ordered the killing of a group of Huguenot leaders, including Coligny, and the slaughter spread throughout Paris. Lasting several weeks in all, the massacre expanded outward to the countryside and other urban centres. Modern estimates for the number of dead across France vary widely, from 5,000 to 30,000.

The massacre marked a turning point in the French Wars of Religion. The Huguenot political movement was crippled by the loss of many of its prominent aristocratic leaders, and many rank-and-file members subsequently converted. Those who remained became increasingly radicalized. Though by no means unique, the blood-letting "was the worst of the century's religious massacres". Throughout Europe, it "printed on Protestant minds the indelible conviction that Catholicism was a bloody and treacherous religion".

Vendee 

In 1986, Reynald Secher argued that the actions of the French republican government during the revolt in the Vendée (1793–1796), a popular mostly Catholic uprising against the anti-clerical Republican government during the French Revolution, was the first modern genocide. Secher's claims caused a minor uproar in France and mainstream authorities rejected Secher's claims.

Timothy Tackett countered that "the Vendée was a tragic civil war with endless horrors committed by both sides—initiated, in fact, by the rebels themselves. The Vendeans were no more blameless than were the republicans. The use of the word genocide is wholly inaccurate and inappropriate." However, historians Frank Chalk and Kurt Jonassohn consider the Vendée a case of genocide. Historian Pierre Chaunu called the Vendée the first ideological genocide. Adam Jones estimates that 150,000 Vendeans died in what he also considers a genocide.

Polish–Lithuanian Commonwealth 
The Khmelnytsky Uprising (also known as the Cossack-Polish War, the Chmielnicki Uprising, or the Khmelnytsky insurrection) was a Cossack rebellion within the Polish–Lithuanian Commonwealth from 1648 to 1657, which led to the creation of a Cossack Hetmanate in Ukrainian lands. Under the command of Hetman Bohdan Khmelnytsky, the Zaporozhian Cossacks, allied with the Crimean Tatars and local peasantry, fought against the armies and paramilitary forces of the Polish–Lithuanian Commonwealth. The insurgency was accompanied by mass atrocities committed by Cossacks against the civilian population, especially against the Roman Catholic clergy and the Jews. In Jewish history, the Uprising is known for the concomitant outrages against the Jews who, in their capacity as leaseholders (arendators), were seen by the peasants as their immediate oppressors.

Most of the Jewish communities which existed in the rebellious Hetmanate were devastated by the uprising and the ensuing massacres, though occasionally a Jewish population was spared, notably after the capture of the town of Brody (the population of which was 70% Jewish). According to the book which is titled History of the Rus, Khmelnytsky's rationale for sparing the Jews of Brody was largely mercantile because Brody was a major trading center and as a result, the Jews who lived there were judged to be useful "for turnovers and profits" and based on this assumption, they were only required to pay "moderate indemnities" in kind.

Although many modern sources still give estimates of Jews killed in the uprising at 100,000 or more, others put the numbers killed at between 40,000 and 100,000, and recent academic studies have argued fatalities were even lower.

A 2003 study by Israeli demographer Shaul Stampfer of Hebrew University dedicated solely to the issue of Jewish casualties in the uprising concludes that 18,000–20,000 Jews were killed of a total population of 40,000. Paul Robert Magocsi states that Jewish chroniclers of the 17th century "provide invariably inflated figures with respect to the loss of life among the Jewish population of Ukraine. The numbers range from 60,000–80,000 (Nathan Hannover) to 100,000 (Sabbatai Cohen), but that "[t]he Israeli scholars Shmuel Ettinger and Bernard D. Weinryb speak instead of the 'annihilation of tens of thousands of Jewish lives', and the Ukrainian-American historian Jarowlaw Pelenski narrows the number of Jewish deaths to between 6,000 and 14,000". Orest Subtelny concludes:
Between 1648 and 1656, tens of thousands of Jews—given the lack of reliable data, it is impossible to establish more accurate figures—were killed by the rebels, and to this day the Khmelnytsky uprising is considered by Jews to be one of the most traumatic events in their history.

Ireland

War of the Three Kingdoms 

Towards the end of the War of the Three Kingdoms (1639–1651), the English Rump Parliament sent the New Model Army to Ireland to subdue and take revenge on the Catholic population of the country and also to prevent Royalists loyal to Charles II from using Ireland as a base to threaten England. The force was initially under the command of Oliver Cromwell and it was later under the command of other parliamentary generals. The Army sought to secure the country, but also to confiscate the lands of Irish families that had been involved in the fighting. This became a continuation of the Elizabethan policy of encouraging Protestant settlement of Ireland, because the Protestant New Model army soldiers could be paid in confiscated lands rather than in cash.

During the Interregnum (1651–1660), this policy was enhanced with the passing of the Act of Settlement of Ireland in 1652. Its goal was a further transfer of land from Irish to English hands. The immediate war aims and the longer term policies of the English Parliamentarians resulted in an attempt by the English to transfer the native population to the western fringes to make way for Protestant settlers. This policy was reflected in a phrase attributed—without factual foundation—to Cromwell: "To Hell or to Connaught" and has been described by some nationalist historians as genocide.

British Empire

Great Irish Famine 

A small number of historians believe that the Great Famine of Ireland (1845–1852) was a genocide. During the famine, approximately 1 million people died and a million more people emigrated from Ireland, causing the island's population to fall by between 20% and 25% and leading to the formation of the Irish diaspora. The proximate cause of the famine was a potato disease which is commonly known as potato blight. Although blight ravaged potato crops throughout Europe during the 1840s, the impact and human cost in Irelandwhere one-third of the population was entirely dependent on the potato for foodwas exacerbated by a host of political, social, and economic factors that remain the subject of historical debate.

According to Liam Kennedy, "virtually all historians of Ireland" reject the genocide allegations. Historian Donald Akenson, who has written twenty-four books on Ireland, has said of the use of the word 'Holocaust' in relation to Ireland: "When you see it, you know that you are encountering famine-porn. It is inevitably part of a presentation that is historically unbalanced and, like other kinds of pornography, is distinguished by a covert (and sometimes overt) appeal to misanthropy and almost always an incitement to hatred."

Oceania

Australia 

According to one report published in 2009, in 1789 the British deliberately spread smallpox from the First Fleet in order to counter overwhelming native tribes near Sydney in New South Wales. In his book An Indelible Stain, Henry Reynolds described this act as genocide. However the majority of scholars disagree that the initial smallpox was the result of deliberate biological warfare and have suggested other causes.

The Black War was a period of conflict between British colonists and aboriginal Tasmanians in Van Diemen's Land (now Tasmania) in the early 19th century. The conflict, in combination with introduced diseases and other factors, had such devastating impacts on the aboriginal Tasmanian population that it was reported that they had been exterminated. Historian Geoffrey Blainey wrote that by 1830, "Disease had killed most of them but warfare and private violence had also been devastating." Smallpox was the principal cause of aboriginal deaths in the 19th century.

Lemkin and most other comparative genocide scholars present the extinction of the Tasmanian aborigines as a textbook example of a genocide, while the majority of Australian experts are more circumspect. Detailed studies of the events surrounding the extinction have raised questions about some of the details and interpretations in earlier histories. Curthoys concluded, "It is time for a more robust exchange between genocide and Tasmanian historical scholarship if we are to understand better what did happen in Tasmania."

On the Australian continent during the colonial period (1788–1901), the population of 500,000–750,000 Australian aborigines was reduced to fewer than 50,000. Most were devastated by the introduction of alien diseases after contact with Europeans, while perhaps 20,000 were killed by massacres and fighting with colonists.

New Zealand 

In the early 19th century, Ngāti Mutunga and Ngāti Tama (local Māori tribes) massacred the Moriori people. The Moriori were the indigenous people of the Chatham Islands (Rekohu in Moriori, Wharekauri in Māori), east of the New Zealand archipelago in the Pacific Ocean. These people lived by a code of non-violence and passive resistance (see Nunuku-whenua), which led to their near-extinction at the hands of Taranaki Māori invaders in the 1830s.

In 1835, some Ngāti Mutunga and Ngāti Tama from the Taranaki region of North Island invaded the Chathams. On 19 November 1835, the Rodney, a European ship hired by the Māori, arrived carrying 500 Māori armed with guns, clubs, and axes, followed by another ship with 400 more warriors on 5 December 1835. They proceeded to enslave some Moriori and kill and cannibalise others. "Parties of warriors armed with muskets, clubs and tomahawks, led by their chiefs, walked through Moriori tribal territories and settlements without warning, permission or greeting. If the districts were wanted by the invaders, they curtly informed the inhabitants that their land had been taken and the Moriori living there were now vassals."

A council of Moriori elders was convened at the settlement called Te Awapatiki. Despite knowing of the Māori predilection for killing and eating the conquered, and despite the admonition by some of the elder chiefs that the principle of Nunuku was not appropriate now, two chiefs—Tapata and Torea—declared that "the law of Nunuku was not a strategy for survival, to be varied as conditions changed; it was a moral imperative." A Moriori survivor recalled: "[The Maori] commenced to kill us like sheep.... [We] were terrified, fled to the bush, concealed ourselves in holes underground, and in any place to escape our enemies. It was of no avail; we were discovered and killed—men, women and children indiscriminately." A Māori conqueror explained, "We took possession... in accordance with our customs and we caught all the people. Not one escaped..."

After the invasion, Moriori were forbidden to marry Moriori, or to have children with each other. All became slaves of the invaders. Many Moriori women had children by their Maori masters. A small number of Moriori women eventually married either Maori or European men. Some were taken from the Chathams and never returned. Only 101 Moriori out of a population of about 2,000 were left alive by 1862. Although the last Moriori of unmixed ancestry, Tommy Solomon, died in 1933, several thousand mixed-ancestry Moriori are alive today.

See also

Notes

References

Bibliography

 
 
 Braudel, Fernand, The Perspective of the World, vol. III of Civilization and Capitalism 1984 (in French 1979).
 
 
 
 
 
 
 
 Cronon, William, Changes in the Land: Indians, Colonists, and the Ecology of New England 1983 
 
 Crosby, Alfred W., Ecological Imperialism: The Biological Expansion of Europe, 900–1900, Cambridge University Press, 1986 
 
 
 
 
 
 
 
 
 
 
  Excerpts Chapter 1: Genocide in prehistory, antiquity, and early modernity

Further reading 

Genocides